David Mansouri (born 21 October 1982 in Glasgow) is a male field hockey player from Scotland, who earned his first cap for the Men's National Team in 2004. 
He plays club hockey for Western Wildcats. Dave Mansouri came through the club's youth system in the late nineties and originally claimed his place in the first team as a full back. His dedication led to his first of 19 caps in 2004, and culminated in selection for the 2006 Commonwealth Games.

As he has matured, he has developed into a combative and highly efficient midfield player bringing a different dimension to today's 1st team.

Given his professional life as a surgeon, it is to his credit that his commitment to hockey has remained so steadfast, to the point that he was able to assume the captaincy in 2009–10. Now very much a senior player, Mansouri's role in the current 1st team remains an absolutely vital one. Mansouri retired from 1st team hockey in 2014.

References
 
sportscotland

1982 births
Living people
Scottish male field hockey players
Field hockey players at the 2006 Commonwealth Games
Field hockey players from Glasgow
Scottish people of Iranian descent
Commonwealth Games competitors for Scotland